Benny Deschrooder (23 July 1980) is a Belgian professional road bicycle racer.

Palmarès
2004 – Vlaanderen - T Interim
1st, Prix de Lillers "Souvenir Bruno Comini" (FRA)
2007 – Chocolade Jacques
2nd, Nationale Sluitingprijs - Putte - Kapellen (BEL)
2008 – An Post–M Donnelly–Grant Thornton–Sean Kelly Team
1st, Stage 1 Team Time Trial, Vuelta a Extremadura (ESP)

External links

1980 births
Living people
Belgian male cyclists
People from Knokke-Heist
Cyclists from West Flanders